Metropolitan Washington Council of Governments (MWCOG) is an independent, nonprofit association where area leaders address regional issues affecting the District of Columbia, suburban Maryland and Northern Virginia. Metropolitan Washington Council of Governments comprises 24 local governments in the Washington metropolitan area, as well as area members of the Maryland and Virginia state legislatures, the U.S. Senate, and the U.S. House of Representatives. About 300 local, state and federal elected officials make up its membership. It was founded in 1957 and formally incorporated on May 28, 1965.

Vision, mission, and functions

"Region Forward" is Metropolitan Washington Council of Governments vision. It is a commitment by Metropolitan Washington Council of Governments and its member governments, who together seek to create a more accessible, sustainable, prosperous, and livable metropolitan Washington."

Metropolitan Washington Council of Governments' mission is to make Region Forward happen by being a discussion forum, expert resource, issue advocate, and catalyst for action.

Metropolitan Washington Council of Governments works on issues of regional significance, including transportation, the environment, land use planning and housing, and public safety and health. Policies are set through the Board of Directors, the National Capital Region Transportation Planning Board (TPB), and the Metropolitan Washington Air Quality Committee. These bodies are the organization's three main boards and they are responsible for a broad range of issues under Metropolitan Washington Council of Governments' umbrella.

Other key boards and policy committees at Metropolitan Washington Council of Governments include the Region Forward Coalition; the Climate, Energy, and Environment Policy Committee; the Chesapeake Bay and Water Resources Policy Committee; and the Human Services and Public Safety Policy Committee. Metropolitan Washington Council of Governments' top priority is advancing the "Region Forward" vision through the work of its board of directors, policy boards, committees, and the following programs.

Transportation
Metropolitan Washington Council of Governments has provided leadership in supporting the development of key transportation facilities in the region, in particular the Washington Metro subway system and Washington Dulles International Airport.

Metropolitan Washington Council of Governments' transportation planning program promotes a well-managed and maintained regional system with a broad range of transportation choices.

Metropolitan Washington Council of Governments supports National Capital Region Transportation Planning Board, the federally designated Metropolitan Planning Organization for the metropolitan Washington area. National Capital Region Transportation Planning Board is responsible for ensuring state and federal approval of funding for transportation projects. National Capital Region Transportation Planning Board became associated with Metropolitan Washington Council of Governments in 1966. National Capital Region Transportation Planning Board's data informs officials on subjects like regional travel patterns and highway and transit performance. Recent projects include identifying regional transportation priorities and funding strategies, improving access for people with disabilities, and better coordinating transportation and land use decisions.

Environment
Clean water, clean air, clean land, and a smaller carbon footprint are priorities of Metropolitan Washington Council of Governments' environmental programs. Through the Metropolitan Washington Air Quality Committee, which is the entity certified by the mayor of Washington, D.C. and the governors of Maryland and Virginia to prepare an air-quality plan for the Washington Metropolitan Area under Section 174 of the federal Clean Air Act Amendments of 1990, officials prepare clean air plans. These plans have led to steady improvement in regional air quality.

Metropolitan Washington Council of Governments supports ongoing efforts to revitalize the Chesapeake Bay, the Anacostia River, and other local waterways as well as wastewater and storm-water planning, and water-supply protection.

Metropolitan Washington Council of Governments guides the regional effort to reduce greenhouse-gas emissions by promoting alternative energy sources, energy conservation, and green building and fleet policies.

Planning and housing
Metropolitan Washington Council of Governments' Community Planning and Services program promotes a strong economy, sustainable growth, and housing options for all residents. Metropolitan Washington Council of Governments offers strategies for more development in the region's mixed-use activity centers and provides the region with population, employment, and housing forecasts, and data on area industries and labor, affordable housing, and homelessness.

Metropolitan Washington Council of Governments regularly measures progress towards the goals of "Region Forward", a long-term sustainability-planning process initiated in 2008.

Public Safety & Health
Safe and healthy communities are the focus of Metropolitan Washington Council of Governments' public safety and health program. Metropolitan Washington Council of Governments brings together area officials, emergency planners, and first responders to improve homeland security and emergency preparedness.

Metropolitan Washington Council of Governments provides regional crime reports and convenes conferences on topics such as preventing the spread of HIV/AIDS, gangs, and childhood obesity.

Member Jurisdictions

Chairpersons

References

External links
 
 
 

Government of the District of Columbia
Local government in Virginia
Local government in Maryland
Metropolitan planning organizations
Non-profit organizations based in Washington, D.C.